Montagu Denis Wyatt Don  (born George Montagu Don; 8 July 1955) is a British horticulturist, broadcaster, and writer who is best known as the lead presenter of the BBC gardening television series Gardeners' World.

Born in Germany and raised in England, Don studied at Magdalene College, Cambridge, where he met his future wife. They ran a successful costume jewellery business through the 1980s until the stock market crash of 1987 resulted in almost complete bankruptcy. In 1989, Don made his television debut as a regular on This Morning with a gardening segment, which led to further television work across the decade including his own shows for BBC Television and Channel 4. Don began his writing career at this time and published his first of over 25 books, in 1990. Between 1994 and 2006, Don wrote a weekly gardening column in The Observer.

In 2003, Don replaced Alan Titchmarsh as the lead presenter of Gardeners' World, only leaving the show between 2008 and 2011 owing to illness. Since then he has written and produced several garden series of his own, the most recent being Monty Don's Adriatic Gardens which aired in 2022.

Early life and education
George Montagu Don was born on 8 July 1955 in Iserlohn, West Germany. He is the youngest of five children to British parents Denis Thomas Keiller Don, a career soldier stationed in Germany at the time of his birth, and Janet Montagu (née Wyatt). Soon after Don's birth, his parents changed the name on his birth certificate to Montagu Denis Don because of a family spat over the name. When Don was 10, he added his mother's maiden name, becoming Montagu Denis Wyatt Don. Don is a descendant of botanist George Don and the Keiller family, best known as the inventors of Keiller's marmalade. On his maternal side, he is descended from the Wyatt family of architects. Don has a twin sister, Alison, who at the age of 19 was nearly killed in a car accident, suffering a broken neck and blindness.

When Don was one, the family moved to Hampshire, England. He described his parents as "very strict". He attended three independent schools: Quidhampton School in Basingstoke, followed by Bigshotte School in Wokingham, where at seven, he was asked to leave school for being too boisterous. He then attended Malvern College in Malvern, which he hated, followed by a state comprehensive school, the Vyne School, also in Basingstoke. He failed his A-levels and while studying for retakes at night school, worked on a building site and a pig farm by day. During his childhood he had become an avid gardener and farmer. In his late teens, Don spent several months in Aix-en-Provence, France where he worked as a gardener and played rugby in local teams. He returned to England, determined to attend Cambridge University out of "sheer bloody-mindedness", and passed the entrance exams. He studied English at Magdalene College, during which time he met his future wife Sarah Erskine, a trained jeweller and architect. Don took up boxing to impress his father, a former heavyweight boxing champion in the army, becoming a Cambridge Half Blue for boxing. He gave up after getting knocked out and suffering concussion.

Career

Jewellery business
In 1981, Don and Erskine started Monty Don Jewellery, a London-based business that designed, made, and sold costume jewellery. The company became a success and in five years, operated from a shop on Beauchamp Place in Knightsbridge with hundreds of outworkers and had secured as many as 60 outlets across the UK, including Harrods, Harvey Nichols, and Liberty. Among their customers were Boy George, Michael Jackson, and Princess Diana. However, the 1987 stock market crash caused an almost complete bankruptcy as it cut off American sales, their biggest market. The situation prompted Don to embark on a career in writing and broadcasting. Reflecting on the experience, he wrote: "We were lambs to the slaughter and we lost everything, [...] we lost our house, our business. We sold every stick of furniture we had at Leominster market". He was unemployed from 1991 to 1993, and spent all of 1992 on the dole. Some of their jewellery is kept at the V&A Museum.

Television

Early career
By mid-1989, Don had written several gardening articles and granted writers access to his home garden which was featured in various publications. This increased exposure led to Don writing a gardening column for the Mail on Sunday, a book deal, and an invitation to a screen test for a proposed weekly live gardening segment on the ITV television breakfast show This Morning. Don landed the spot and his first segment aired in October 1989, receiving £100 a show. After 26 spots on This Morning, Don landed additional television work as presenter on the BBC Television shows Holiday and Tomorrow's World. Though he had some doubts about being a presenter, he took the jobs as he felt desperate for work. In November 1999, Channel 4 started to air the gardening series Fork to Fork, in which Don and his wife presented segments on growing and cooking organic vegetables. This was followed by three other series hosted by Don between 1999 and 2003: Real Gardens, Lost Gardens, and Don Roaming.

Gardeners' World

In September 2002, the BBC announced Don as the new lead presenter of its long-running series Gardeners' World from 2003, succeeding Alan Titchmarsh. Don is the first self-taught horticulturist presenter in the show's history. Don hosted the show until he put his career on hold to recover from his minor stroke in 2008, and the show continued with Toby Buckland filling in as host. During Don's initial stint, viewing figures fell from 5 million to 2 million, this fall being most frequently blamed on the BBC's decision to change the show's format soon after Don's arrival. After viewing figures fell below two million for the first time in 2009, the BBC announced further changes to the programme to entice viewers back. In December 2010, Don announced his return as host for the 2011 series. Reaction to the announcement was divided on the programme's blog.

Initially Don filmed episodes of Gardeners' World in Berryfields, a rented garden in Stratford-upon-Avon. When he returned as host in 2011, Don began to present from his own garden, Longmeadow, in Ivington, Herefordshire. He was frequently seen on screen with his Golden Retriever Nigel until the dog died in May 2020, shortly before its 12th birthday. In 2016, Don introduced viewers to his new golden retriever, Nell. This was followed by the addition of Patti, a Yorkshire Terrier, in April 2020. In 2020, Don signed a contract with the BBC to continue presenting Gardeners' World for three years.

Own series

Don is also known for writing and presenting his own series. In 2005, he set up a  smallholding in Herefordshire so a group of young drug offenders could work the land. The project was documented for the BBC series Growing Out of Trouble, airing in 2006. This was followed by the ambitious BBC series Around the World in 80 Gardens in 2008, where Don visited 80 gardens of a variety of styles worldwide. In 2010, Don presented My Dream Farm, a Channel 4 series which helped people learn to become successful smallholders, and Mastercrafts, a BBC series which celebrated six traditional British crafts. Monty Don's Italian Gardens aired on the BBC in 2011, which was followed by Monty Don's French Gardens, in 2013. Later that year, Don presented an episode of Great British Garden Revival. In 2014, Don became the lead presenter for the BBC's flagship Chelsea Flower Show coverage, again replacing Titchmarsh.

In 2015, Don presented the four-part BBC series The Secret History of the British Garden, charting the development of British gardens from the 17th to the 20th century. Since 2014, Don has presented three series of Big Dreams, Small Spaces, where he helps amateur gardeners in creating their own "dream spaces" on a domestic scale. Don's next series was Monty Don's Paradise Gardens in 2018, travelling across the Islamic world and beyond in search of paradise gardens and considering their place in the Quran. This was followed by Monty Don's Japanese Gardens in 2019, Monty Don's American Gardens in 2020, and Monty Don's Adriatic Gardens in 2022.

Writer
Don has described himself primarily as a writer, "who happens to have lots of television work." By the early 1990s, Don had written two unpublished novels, The Clematis Affair and An Afternoon in Padua. He later described them as "excruciatingly bad". In January 1994, Allan Jenkins, then editor of The Observer, invited Don to write a weekly gardening column for the newspaper. The column began in February of that year and lasted until May 2006; Jenkins was his editor for seven years. In a piece from 2004 to commemorate the tenth year of the column, Don wrote: "It has been more life-changing than any other work I have done in my adult life." Don has written articles for the Daily Mail and Mail Online since 2004.

In 2005 the book The Jewel Garden: A Story of Despair and Redemption, a joint autobiography and the story of their home and gardens at Longmeadow, by Don and his wife Sarah, was published by Routledge.

In 2016 Hodder Books published an audiobook of Don's Nigel: My Family and Other Dogs, read by the author.

Style and reception
Between 2008 and 2016 Don was President of the Soil Association. He is currently a patron of Bees for Development Trust and the Pope's Grotto Preservation Trust.

Don had never received formal training as a gardener. In 2006 he commented, "I was – am – an amateur gardener and a professional writer. My only authority came from a lifetime of gardening and a passion amounting to an obsession for my own garden."

Don is a keen proponent of organic gardening, becoming "officially" organic in his own garden in 1997. The practice of organic techniques often features in his published and broadcast work. The organic approach is most prominent in his 2003 book The Complete Gardener. This has led him into some controversy with those advocating non-organic techniques, with some criticising his position of influence presenting Gardeners' World and exclusion of non-organic solutions to pests and diseases in the garden.

Don's sartorial style in the garden has been the subject of some critical attention, with Richard D. North commenting, in 2013:

In 2005, Don himself dedicated a whole column to this subject, commenting:

In June 2020 Prospect magazine declared Don "the nation's gardener". Comedian Joe Lycett has described Monty Don as a gay icon.

Personal life

Family
Don married Sarah Erskine in 1983. They have two sons, Adam and Tom, and daughter Freya. The couple lived in Islington, north London, while Don pursued postgraduate study at the London School of Economics and worked as a waiter at Joe Allen restaurant in Covent Garden and later as a binman. The couple then moved to the De Beauvoir Town area of Hackney where they made their first garden. In 1989, they relocated to The Hanburies, a country house in Herefordshire. The making of the garden there, and the subsequent loss of the house in the aftermath of the crash of their jewellery business, was the subject of Don's first book, The Prickotty Bush. In 1991, the Dons bought a home in Ivington, Herefordshire where they started to create a new garden named Longmeadow. The home was unfit to live in at the time of purchase, so while they refurbished it they rented a home in Leominster that was infested with rats and had no heating. They moved into their Ivington home at the end of 1992.

Nigel and other dogs

Don has owned many dogs throughout his adult life. Three that he currently own are Nellie and Ned, Golden Retrievers, and Patti, a Yorkshire terrier; which are seen on camera with Don on Gardeners' World. He also owns dogs that are not featured on the show. The coppice at Longmeadow holds the graves of Dons' other pets, including dogs Beaufort, Red, Poppy and Barry, and cats Stimpy and Blue. Don also has a sheep farm, on which he keeps 500 ewes.

Nigel was a male Golden Retriever dog owned by Don. Nigel made many appearances on Gardeners' World, sometimes with Nellie. The dog was chosen as a seven-week-old puppy from a litter in the Forest of Dean on 1 July 2008 and was popular with viewers who were concerned when he disappeared from the programme in September 2012. He had injured himself after twisting sideways when jumping to catch a tennis ball and had ruptured an intervertebral disc in his spine. Nigel recovered and resumed his television appearances.

Don said that he had chosen Nigel because the domestic dog signifies the good and bad in human relationships with nature; humans can prioritise fluffy animals over others. In September 2016 an autobiographical book entitled Nigel: my family and other dogs was published, telling the story of Nigel and the other dogs in Don's life, including the female golden retriever, Nellie. On 11 May 2020 Don announced, through his Twitter and Instagram pages, that Nigel had died, six days before his 12th birthday. Don told the BBC Radio 4 Today programme that Nigel had been more than a companion and had helped him with his struggles with depression. He said, "He was a bear of slightly limited brain, what he had was this absolute sense of purity. He exuded a kind of unsullied innocence and we all love our dogs, everybody thinks their dog is special, I've had lots of dogs and there was something special about Nigel." As with Don's other dogs, Nigel is buried in the garden at Longmeadow.

Health
Don has suffered with depression since his mid-twenties. He first wrote about his experiences with it, and its effect on his personal life, in a piece for The Observer in 2000. His editor recalled that it "changed the way that people saw him" and Don himself said the article generated "a very immediate response" from readers. Don recalled "great spans of muddy time" in his life and realised that gardening "heals me better than any medicine". This quote served as the inspiration for William Doyle's 2021 album Great Spans of Muddy Time.

At one point, Don's wife threatened to leave with their children if he did not seek help. After receiving cognitive behavioural therapy and taking Prozac for a short time, Don quit both when he realised his depression was mostly seasonal, which he attributed to seasonal affective disorder, and found relief with a lightbox.

In August 2007, Don suffered from a bout of peritonitis, an abdominal infection. His wife had found him unconscious on the floor and he was rushed to hospital for emergency surgery.

In February 2008, Don suffered a minor stroke at home. He had been feeling unwell since the previous Christmas, owing mostly to exhaustion from travelling to film Around the World in 80 Gardens. When his symptoms did not improve, a brain scan weeks later revealed a temporary blockage in one of the arteries to his brain. In May 2008 he put his career on hold to recover.

In 2015 Don said that years of gardening had left him with sore knees, one of which causes constant pain and needs replacing.

In May 2022 it was reported that Don had COVID-19 and had been bedridden for four days.

Other
In July 2006 he appeared on BBC Radio 4's Desert Island Discs, choosing an eclectic mix of pop and classical records; the Beatles' "A Hard Day's Night" was his favourite disc, his book choice was Collected Poems by Henry Vaughan and his luxury item the painting Hendrikje Bathing by Rembrandt.

Shortly before he fell ill with his stroke, Don had launched the Monty Don Project, a charity to help persistent offenders and drug addicts heal themselves by working the land.

Honours
Don was made an Officer of the Order of the British Empire (OBE) in the 2018 Birthday Honours for services to horticulture, to broadcasting and to charity.

In May 2022 he was awarded the Victoria Medal of Honour by the council of the Royal Horticultural Society.

Publications

Books

DVDs
 Around the World in 80 Gardens (2008)
 Monty Don's Italian Gardens (2011)
 Monty Don's French Gardens (2013)
 Monty Don's Real Craft (2014)
 The Secret History of the British Garden (2015)
 Monty Don's Paradise Gardens (2018)
 Monty Don's Japanese Gardens (2019)
 Monty Don's American Gardens (2020)

References

External links
 
 

1955 births
Living people
People from Iserlohn
20th-century English non-fiction writers
21st-century English writers
Alumni of Magdalene College, Cambridge
English garden writers
English people of Scottish descent
English television presenters
English gardeners
People educated at Malvern College
People from Herefordshire
Officers of the Order of the British Empire
Organic gardeners